Bozell is an American full-service public relations and advertising agency in Omaha, Nebraska, United States, North America.

History
Bozell traces its roots to the company founded in 1921 in Omaha, Nebraska by Leo Bozell and Morris Jacobs as Bozell & Jacobs, Inc. In 1985, the firm was purchased by Lorimar and merged with another Lorimar entity, Kenyon & Eckhardt to form Bozell, Jacobs, Kenyon & Eckhardt. In 1992 the firm shortened its name to Bozell Worldwide. From 1986 to 1993, the company was headed by noted advertisement executive Leo-Arthur Kelmenson, who contributed significantly to the turnaround of Chrysler Corporation.

Bozell is well known for its campaigns, which have introduced memorable slogans and ads, such as:
"Pork. The Other White Meat"
"Corinthian leather"
"Genesis does what Nintendon't"
"The Old Home Fill-er-up and Keep On-a-Truckin' Café"

In 1997, Bozell was acquired by True North, holding company for FCB. The New York Times described the combination as
the sixth largest advertising company.

In 2001, the remaining largest offices of Bozell Worldwide were merged with Lowe Worldwide as part of the Interpublic Group of Companies. The managing partners of the Bozell office in Omaha then bought themselves out from the holding company, renamed using the historic Bozell & Jacobs name, and continued as an independent shop again; other units of the conglomerate continue as Bozell.

In 2013, Bozell proclaimed on their website Women’s Business Enterprise National Council (WBENC) certification for being 50+% woman-owned.

See also
Gonzalo Tassier

References

External links

Advertising agencies of the United States
Companies based in Omaha, Nebraska
Marketing companies established in 1921
1921 establishments in Nebraska